Colonel Crofton Moore Vandeleur (1809 – 8 November 1881) was an Irish landowner and Conservative Party politician from Kilrush in County Clare. He sat in the House of Commons of the United Kingdom from 1859 to 1874 as a Member of Parliament (MP) for Clare.

Family 

He was the oldest son of John Ormsby Vandeleur of Kilrush, who had been an MP in both the pre-union Parliament of Ireland and then in the union parliament. His mother was Lady Frances Moore, daughter of Charles Moore, 1st Marquess of Drogheda, and Lady Anne Seymour-Conway.

The Vandeleur family were of Dutch origin. They were initially based at Ralahine in Sixmilebridge, by James Vandeleur in the late 1630s, and were compensated by the Cromwellians for losses during the 1641 rebellion. Their holdings were confirmed by Charles II. They arrived in Kilrush in 1688, and prospered.

In 1828, he succeeded to his father's extensive estates, which by the middle of the century included almost 20,000 acres in County Clare, mostly in the barony of Moyarta. At the time of Griffith's Valuation in 1868, they held at least 17 townlands in the parish of Kilrush, where his father had built Kilrush House in 1808.
The Vandeleurs effectively owned the town, which John had set about developing. His efforts were continued during the 19th century by Crofton and Crofton's son Hector Vandeleur. However, their lack of compassion during the Great Famine and later their bad record as absentee landlords, left a legacy of hostility to the family, exacerbated by widespread evictions in the 1880s.

Early life 

Vandeleur was educated at Harrow and at Trinity College, Cambridge. In 1862 he married Lady Grace Graham-Toler, second daughter of the 2nd Earl of Norbury.

Career 
Vandeleur became a magistrate for County Clare, and a Deputy Lieutenant of the county. He was High Sheriff of County Clare in 1832, and in 1838 he became Colonel of the Clare Militia.

He stood unsuccessfully in the Clare constituency at the 1835, 1841 and 1852 general elections. He won a seat on his fourth attempt, at the 1859 general election, and held it until 1874.

Death 
Vandeleur died on 8 November 1881. He was succeeded in his estates by his oldest son Hector Vandeleur. Kilrush House burned down near the end of the century, and the Vandeleurs gradually severed their connection with the town. His descendants included two distinguished soldiers who served in World War II, Joe Vandeleur and Giles Vandeleur.

References

External links 

 Family: Vandeleur (Kilrush), at the NUI Landed Estates database

1809 births
1881 deaths
19th-century Irish landowners
People from Kilrush
Politicians from County Clare
Irish Conservative Party MPs
People educated at Harrow School
Alumni of Trinity College, Cambridge
UK MPs 1859–1865
UK MPs 1865–1868
UK MPs 1868–1874
Members of the Parliament of the United Kingdom for County Clare constituencies (1801–1922)
High Sheriffs of Clare
Deputy Lieutenants of County Clare